Walter Zadek (26 March 1900 – 20 December 1992) was a German-born Israeli photographer.

Selected artwork
 1925 Photograph of the Mounting of the " Tel Aviv Municipality" Sign
 1934 Girl with flag
 1936 Woman on a swing, Palestine 
 1939 Immigrants aboard the Parita ship

References
 General

 Specific

External links 
 
 Walter Zadek  on Artfact

Israeli photographers
1900 births
1992 deaths
Early photographers in Palestine
German emigrants to Mandatory Palestine